Eirik Tage Johansen (born 23 May 1982) is a Norwegian professional golfer.

Johansen was born in the United States, and returned to the country of his birth as a successful amateur golfer, taking up a golf scholarship at the University of South Carolina, where he was a member of the golf team. After graduating in 2006, he turned professional, and immediately won a place on the European Tour after advancing through qualifying school. After a disappointing first season, he dropped down to the second-tier Challenge Tour for 2008, but was once again successful at qualifying school at the end of that season. Johansen has retained his place on the European Tour from 2009 to 2011, although he had to return to qualifying school every year.

Johansen also has four wins on the Scandinavian Nordic Golf League; the first of these was while still an amateur.

Amateur wins
2001 Norwegian Amateur
2003 Norwegian Amateur

Professional wins (6)

Challenge Tour wins (1)

Nordic Golf League wins (4)

Norwegian Golf Tour wins (1)

Team appearances
Amateur
Jacques Léglise Trophy (representing the Continent of Europe): 1999
Eisenhower Trophy (representing Norway): 2000, 2004
European Amateur Team Championship (representing Norway): 2001, 2003, 2005

See also
2006 European Tour Qualifying School graduates
2008 European Tour Qualifying School graduates
2009 European Tour Qualifying School graduates
2010 European Tour Qualifying School graduates

References

External links

Norwegian male golfers
South Carolina Gamecocks men's golfers
European Tour golfers
Sportspeople from Stavanger
People from Ventura, California
Sportspeople from Ventura County, California
1982 births
Living people